Edén is an 2022 Spanish psychological drama film directed and written by Estefanía Cortés which stars Charlotte Vega alongside Marta Nieto, Ramón Barea, and Israel Elejalde.

Plot 
A young woman (Marina) moves to a remote centre run by a clandestine company set to commit suicide. There she meets another three people with different backgrounds (Lidia, Félix, and Victor).

Cast

Production 

Edén is a Montreux Entertainment, La Caña Brothers, La Colmena and El Edén AIE production, with participation of TVE and Aragón Televisión.

Release 
The film had its world premiere in the 'Meeting Point' section of the 67th Valladolid International Film Festival (Seminci) on 24 October 2022. Distributed by Syldavia, it was theatrically released in Spain on 28 October 2022.

Reception 
Manuel J. Lombardo of Diario de Sevilla rated the film 2 out of 5 stars, considering that the film, a "flawed" attempt to either open a debate or reflect about euthanasia, ends up looking too much at its own navel and "those of creatures that, with the exception of the one played by Ramón Barea, look like laboratory robots in a sad, old-fashioned existentialist theatre performance".

Mikel G. Gurpegui of El Correo rated the film 1 out of 5 stars, underscoring how "the atmosphere created is not enough, some sequences border on the ridiculous and morbidity wins the battle against depth", with the more the protagonists talk, the more feigned it all sounds.

David Pardillos of Cinemanía rated the film 3 out of 5 stars, considering that even if the mise-en-scene could be too rough, the attempt to confront ourselves with such an important issue is laudable.

See also 
 List of Spanish films of 2022

References 

2022 drama films
Films about euthanasia
Films shot in the province of Huesca
2020s psychological drama films
Spanish drama films
2020s Spanish-language films
2020s Spanish films